Bathycreadium is a genus of trematodes in the family Opecoelidae.

Species
Bathycreadium biscayense Bray, 1973
Bathycreadium brayi Pérez-del-Olmo, Dallarés, Carrassón & Kostadinova, 2014
Bathycreadium elongata (Maillard, 1970) Bray, 1973
Bathycreadium flexicollis Kabata, 1961
Bathycreadium nanaflexicolle Dronen, Rubec & Underwood, 1977 emend. Pérez-del-Olmo, Dallarés, Carrassón & Kostadinova, 2014

References

Opecoelidae
Plagiorchiida genera